William Kirby Linvill (August 8, 1919 – August 17, 1980) was an American electrical engineer. He served as a professor at Stanford University from 1960 to 1980. He was the founder of the Institute in Engineering-Economic Systems at Stanford, which later became the Department of Engineering-Economic Systems, with Linvill as the first chair.

His identical twin brother John was also a professor of electrical engineering at Stanford University.

References 

1919 births
1980 deaths
People from Kansas City, Missouri
American electrical engineers
William Jewell College alumni
Massachusetts Institute of Technology alumni
Stanford University faculty
20th-century American engineers